Carlos Augusto Cardoso Gorito (born May 17, 1986) is a Brazilian who lives and performs in South Korea as a television personality and embassy worker. He is currently a cast member in the talk show Non-Summit. In 2015, he wrote a column for the JoongAng Ilbo newspaper on topics like association football, Korean Wave and traditional festivals.

Filmography

Television series

Film

References

External links

1986 births
Living people
Brazilian television personalities
Brazilian expatriates in South Korea
Brazilian diplomats
People from Resende
Sungkyunkwan University alumni
Federal University of Rio Grande do Sul alumni